Catherine Fisher may refer to:

Kitty Fisher, Catherine Maria Fisher, courtesan
Catherine Fisher, author
Catherine Fisher (Falling Skies), fictional character

See also
Kate Fisher (disambiguation)